Stefano Volpi or Volpe (c. 1585–1642) was an Italian painter from the early Baroque art period, mainly painting sacred subjects in Siena, Italy. According to Luigi Lanzi, he was either a pupil or collaborator with Rutilio Manetti. Among his works are paintings in the churches of Santi Quirico e Giulitta, San Raimondo, San Sebastiano and San Domenico in Siena.

References

1585 births
1642 deaths
People from the Province of Siena
17th-century Italian painters
Italian male painters
Painters from Siena
Mannerist painters
Italian Baroque painters